Hasanabad (also Romanized as Hasanâbâd; also known as Hasanābād-e Fashāfūyeh) is a city in, and the capital of, Fashapuyeh District of Ray County, Tehran province, Iran. At the 2006 census, its population was 20,451 in 4,993 households. The following census in 2011 counted 27,859 people in 7,415 households. The latest census in 2016 showed a population of 43,922 people in 12,316 households.

References 

Ray County, Iran

Cities in Tehran Province

Populated places in Tehran Province

Populated places in Ray County, Iran